Drachen Studio Kecur is a German aircraft manufacturer based in Mettmann, North Rhine-Westphalia. The company specializes in the design and manufacture of ultralight trikes and wings for them.

Background

The company is known for its Drachen Studio Kecur Royal 912 trike design that is produced in Slovenia under sub-contract and for its in-house wing design, the EOS 15, that uses spoiler control for roll.

Aircraft

References

External links

Aircraft manufacturers of Germany
Ultralight trikes